Yousef Sayed (Arabic:يوسف سيد) (born 1 April 2001) is an Egyptian footballer.

External links

References

Emirati footballers
1989 births
Living people
Al Ahli Club (Dubai) players
Hatta Club players
Place of birth missing (living people)
UAE Pro League players
Association football defenders